The Magic Carpets of Aladdin is a ride in Magic Kingdom, at Walt Disney World. It is based on the 1992 film, Aladdin. It is similar to the Dumbo the Flying Elephant attraction in that riders in the front rows control how high their carpets fly, and the ride lasts about 90 seconds. At the entrance, a camel statue squirts guests as they walk by, much like the Stitch figurine outside the World of Disney store.

The shops near this attraction are themed to Agrabah's marketplace from the film, and the Aladdin, Jasmine, and Genie walk-around characters are often available for meet-and-greets in the nearby buildings.

Related attractions 
The attraction opened at Walt Disney Studios Park in Disneyland Paris on March 16, 2002, as Flying Carpets Over Agrabah. The attraction is set against a large "movie set" backdrop of Agrabah, with guests playing as the extras in Genie's directorial debut. This is the last ride which opened on the opening day of the park which is still operating.

A third version of the attraction opened at Tokyo DisneySea in Tokyo Disney Resort on July 18, 2011, as Jasmine's Flying Carpets. The attraction is next to Sindbad's Storybook Voyage.

References

Amusement rides manufactured by Zamperla
Magic Kingdom
Walt Disney Studios Park
Tokyo DisneySea
Adventureland (Disney)
Toon Studio (Walt Disney Studios Park)
Arabian Coast (Tokyo DisneySea)
Amusement rides introduced in 2001
Amusement rides introduced in 2002
Amusement rides introduced in 2011
2001 establishments in Florida
2002 establishments in France
2011 establishments in Japan